Anzin-Saint-Aubin is a commune in the Pas-de-Calais department in northern France.

Geography
A suburb located 2 miles (3 km) northwest of Arras, at the junction of the D341, D60 and D64 roads, by the banks of the river Scarpe.

History
Anzin St. Aubin was formed from two villages: Saint Aubin, formerly Saint Aubin in the Marsh, on the road to Arras, by the Scarpe river and Anzin, on the same road, but further east, bordering on Arras.
The parish was created around the 12th century, with the church being built at Saint Aubin (the larger of the two villages). 
The name of Anzin (Anzinum) appears around 866-870, that of Saint Aubin (Sancti Albini of Marex) only appears in 1154.
In the 16th century, the abbey at Saint Vaast built a watermill at Anzin. This mill (its remains still exist) mostly manufactured oil but also gunpowder and paper. 
During the years 1793–1794 the town became "the united brothers" under revolutionary leadership. The commune was first created in 1790 with the election of the first municipal council and the mayor, Noël Douchet, a 56-year-old farmer. All the property of the church was sold. 
In the early 19th century, Anzin grew in population and many houses were built along the old Roman road, the Chausée Brunehaut.  The village was all but destroyed during World War I, having served as a base for soldiers and artillery. The church and the chateau were transformed into hospitals. 
The population suffered again during the Second World War, from 1939 to 1945, as more people died in battle or in captivity, while others participated in the resistance or helping prisoners to escape. Since 1950, the town has experienced strong growth as the numbers involved in farming declined. The population increased from 1052 inhabitants in 1970 to 2553 in 1990 and nearly 3000 in 2006. This is one of the largest growth rates in the Pas-de-Calais.

Population

Sights
 The church of St. Aubin, dating from the seventeenth century.
 The church of Sacré-coeur, dating from the nineteenth century.
 The eighteenth-century chateau, nowadays the mairie.
 The brightly painted water-tower.
 Arras golf course.
 The war memorial

See also
Communes of the Pas-de-Calais department

References

External links

 Commonwealth War Graves Commission - Anzin St.Aubin
 Official website of the commune 
 Another website about the commune 

Communes of Pas-de-Calais